Performative verbs are verbs carried out simply by means of uttering them aloud. When a judge sentences someone to jail time, for example, the action is completed when he or she says, "I hereby sentence you to five years in prison," or the like. Compare this with the sentence, "I run every day," in which the verb "run" merely represents the action of moving quickly.

Other examples

We order the defendant to pay damages in the amount of $20,000.
I move for a mistrial.
I quit.
I resign.
I do. (wedding vow)

Identification
One can identify a performative verb by using the "Hereby" Test. In English, only performative verbs may be preceded by "hereby" while other verbs in the same context are unacceptable. For example, in the sentences below, 1 and 2 differ only in the verb and both are acceptable. In the corresponding pair, 3 and 4, the use of "hereby" before the non-performative verb see is not coherent because the action of seeing is not performed simply by its utterance.

 I confer this award
 I see this award
 I hereby confer this award
 I hereby see this award

See also 
 Performative utterance
 Speech act

References

Verb types
Semantics